Adi Yaduraya  (later, Vijaya Raja Wodeyar; 1371–1423) was the first raja of Mysore from 1399 until his death in October 1423. The Vijayanagara emperor Harihara II installed Yaduraya as his vassal and as a dedicated ruler of Mysore principality in 1399 to suppress the opposition of the Dalvoys. The Dalvoys were a decommissioned clan of royal fighters, advisers, and ministers who were active in the Vijayanagara Empire before, during, and after Harihara II and Yaduraya.

References 

1371 births
1432 deaths
Kings of Mysore
Yaduraya